Mian Mahalleh-ye Zakleh Bar (also Romanized as Mīān Maḩalleh-ye Zākleh Bar; also known as Zāklebar and Zāklīvar) is a village in Ahandan Rural District, in the Central District of Lahijan County, Gilan Province, Iran. At the 2006 census, its population was 274, in 77 families.

References 

Populated places in Lahijan County